Deportivo Comercio is a Peruvian football club, playing in the city of Juanjuí, San Martín, Peru.

History
Not to be confused with Deportivo Comercio from the city of Moyobamba, which played in the 1991 Torneo Descentralizado, Deportivo Comercio from the city of Juanjuí were founded in 1995. Deportivo Comercio is of the clubs with greater tradition in the city of Juanjuí, San Martín, Peru. 

In 2001, 2004, and 2006, the club classified to Regional Stage but was eliminated.

Honours

Regional
Región III:
 Runner-up (1): 2001

Liga Departalmental de San Martín:
Winners (2): 2001, 2006
 Runner-up (1): 2004

Liga Provincial de Mariscal Cáceres:
Winners (2): 2001, 2004, 2005, 2006, 2008, 2009, 2017

Liga Distrital de Juanjuí:
Winners (10): 2001, 2004, 2005, 2006, 2008, 2009, 2017
 Runner-up (1): 2011, 2016.

See also
List of football clubs in Peru
Peruvian football league system

External links

Football clubs in Peru